Jeffrey P. Hatch (born September 28, 1979) is a former American football player who was an offensive tackle in the National Football League (NFL) for three seasons between 2002 and 2005. He was on the rosters of the New York Giants and Tampa Bay Buccaneers, starting in four games for the Giants in 2003. He played his college football at the University of Pennsylvania, and was named a Division I-AA All-American in 2001. The Giants selected Hatch during the third round of the 2002 NFL Draft with the 78th overall pick.

Hatch starred in two documentaries; ESPN's Hey Rookie, Welcome to the NFL, and CNN/SI's, Goal To Go. Hatch is also a noted artist, having shown and sold his paintings and photographs around the country. He has also spent time acting and doing stunt work in Hollywood, with notable roles in the Jeff Bridges and Ryan Reynolds led R.I.P.D., as well as the lead role in a mid-level independent film, Brutal.

According to Politico in a July 22, 2019, article, Hatch (who was working for a New Hampshire state funded treatment center, Granite State Recovery) pleaded guilty to a drug charge on July 19, 2019, and was under a plea deal to serve four years in prison.

References

1979 births
Living people
New York Giants players
Tampa Bay Buccaneers players
Penn Quakers football players
Sportspeople from Annapolis, Maryland
Players of American football from Maryland